Suibne mac Cuanach, 29th Abbot of Clonmacnoise, died 816. 

Suibhne mac Cuanach was a member of the Uí Briúin Seola from what is now County Galway. The Chronicon Scotorum states that he "...rested thirty days after the burning of Cluain."

References

External links
http://www.ucc.ie/celt/published/T100016/

9th-century Irish abbots
816 deaths
Year of birth unknown
Christian clergy from County Galway
Religion in County Offaly